The Black Fork Mountain Wilderness Area is located in the U.S. states of Arkansas and Oklahoma. Created by an act of Congress in 1984, the wilderness covers an area of 13,139 acres (53 km²). The Arkansas portion contains  and the Oklahoma portion contains . Located within Ouachita National Forest, the wilderness is managed by the U.S. Forest Service.

This infrequently visited wilderness follows the main ridgeline of Black Fork Mountain for 13 miles (21 km) which rises to more than 2,400 feet (731 m). Steep cliffsides provide sanctuary to groves of Dwarf Oak, Serviceberry and Granddaddy Greybeard (known as the fringe tree Chionanthus) which have a few unique species represented here.

There are few trails through the wilderness and none at all in the Oklahoma sections. Visitors should expect difficult hiking conditions and few sources for water as there are only two springs along the higher mountain slopes. Black bears are known to inhabit the wilderness, along with white-tailed deer, bobcat, skunk and pheasant.

The wilderness contains extensive areas of unlogged, old-growth forest.  Along the ridge of Black Fork Mountain are several thousand acres of stunted old-growth Post Oak, Shortleaf Pine, and Hickory. There is also a small grove of old-growth sugar maple forest nestled in the folds of the mountain slopes. 

U.S. Wilderness Areas do not allow motorized or mechanized vehicles, including bicycles. Although camping and fishing are usually allowed with a proper permit, no roads or buildings can be constructed and there is also no logging or mining, in compliance with the 1964 Wilderness Act. Wilderness areas within National Forests and Bureau of Land Management areas also allow hunting in season.

The mountain was the site of the crash of Texas International Airlines Flight 655 on September 27, 1973, in which 11 persons died.

See also
 List of U.S. Wilderness Areas
 List of old growth forests

References

External links 
 
 
 
 

Protected areas of Le Flore County, Oklahoma
Protected areas of Polk County, Arkansas
Protected areas of Scott County, Arkansas
Wilderness areas of Arkansas
Wilderness areas of Oklahoma
Old-growth forests
Ouachita National Forest
1984 establishments in Arkansas
Protected areas established in 1984
1984 establishments in Oklahoma